Clark Township is a township in Marion County, Kansas, United States.  As of the 2010 census, the township population was 147, including the west side of Pilsen.

Geography

Communities
The township contains the following settlements:
 Unincorporated community of Pilsen (west of Remington Road).  The east part is located in Clear Creek Township.

Cemeteries
The township contains the following cemeteries:
 No cemeteries.

References

Further reading

External links
 Marion County website
 City-Data.com
 Marion County maps: Current, Historic, KDOT

Townships in Marion County, Kansas
Townships in Kansas